The Commonwealth of Massachusetts has a total of 191 National Historic Landmarks (NHLs) within its borders.  This is the second highest statewide total in the United States after New York, which has more than 250.  Of the Massachusetts NHLs, 57 are in the state capital of Boston, and are listed separately.  Ten of the remaining 134 designations were made when the NHL program was formally inaugurated on October 9, 1960; the most recent were in 2021.  Cambridge is the city with the most NHLs outside Boston (at 19), and Middlesex County is home to 43 NHLs (again outside the 58 from Boston, which comprise all but two of the NHLs in Suffolk County).  Every county in the state has at least one NHL (Franklin County has exactly one, the Old Deerfield Historic District).

The state's NHLs were chosen for a diversity of reasons.  Some of the nation's oldest surviving structures are included: a number of 17th-century houses are listed, including the Fairbanks House (late 1630s) of Dedham, which is the oldest timber-frame house in the nation.  The Old Ship Church (1681) of Hingham is the nation's oldest church still used for religious purposes, and Cole's Hill in Plymouth was used in 1620 has a burial ground for the Plymouth Colony.  The Nauset Archeological District documents early contact between Europeans and Native Americans, and the Old Deerfield Historic District encompasses a well-preserved colonial frontier village.

Sites associated with the American Revolution and people of the time are on the list.  The Lexington Green, Buckman Tavern, and the Hancock-Clarke House all played roles in the Battles of Lexington and Concord that began the American Revolutionary War, as did Wright's Tavern in Concord.  The homes of Continental Army generals Benjamin Lincoln, John Glover, and Rufus Putnam are listed.  Properties occupied by army officers during the Siege of Boston include the Longfellow House (occupied by George Washington and purchased by Henry Wadsworth Longfellow in part because of that association), and the Isaac Royall House.

In addition to the Longfellow site, there are numerous NHLs with literary and artistic connections.  Arrowhead in the Berkshires was where Herman Melville did much of his writing, and Concord is home to Walden Pond, the Ralph Waldo Emerson House, The Old Manse (home to Ralph Waldo Emerson's grandfather), Orchard House (childhood home to Louisa May Alcott), and The Wayside (home to Nathaniel Hawthorne).  Hawthorne is also represented by the House of Seven Gables district of Salem, which includes his birthplace.  Other literary landmarks include the John Greenleaf Whittier House, The Mount (Edith Wharton's Lenox estate), and Redtop, the Belmont home of William Dean Howells which was the site of many literary gatherings.

Scientific and academic pursuits are represented in the list.  Homes of mathematicians, scientists, and researchers appear on the list, as do sites noted for the events that took place there.  The Blue Hill Meteorological Observatory in Milton is home to the nation's longest continuous weather record, and the Goddard Rocket Launching Site in Auburn was where rocketry pioneer Robert H. Goddard performed some of his tests.

National Historic Landmarks

|}

See also
List of areas in the National Park System in Massachusetts
Adams National Historical Park
Minute Man National Historical Park
New Bedford Whaling National Historical Park
Salem Maritime National Historic Site
List of U.S. National Historic Landmarks by state
National Register of Historic Places listings in Massachusetts

Notes

External links 

National Historic Landmarks Program, at National Park Service
National Park Service listings of National Historic Landmarks

Massachusetts
 
National Historic Landmarks
Historic
Landmarks